The 2017–18 Boston Bruins season was the 94th season for the National Hockey League franchise that was established on November 1, 1924.

Standings

Schedule and results

Preseason
The Bruins announced their preseason schedule on June 1, 2017.

Regular season
The Bruins' regular season schedule was made public on June 22, 2017.

Playoffs

Player statistics
Final Stats

Skaters

Goaltenders

 
†Denotes player spent time with another team before joining the Bruins. Statistics reflect time with the Bruins only.
‡Denotes player was traded mid-season. Statistics reflect time with the Bruins only.
Bold/italics denotes franchise record.

Awards and honors

Milestones

Records

Transactions
The Bruins have been involved in the following transactions during the 2017–18 season.

Trades

Notes:
  Boston to retain 50% of salary as part of trade.
  New York to retain 50% of salary as part of trade.

Free agents acquired

Free agents lost

Claimed via waivers

Lost via waivers

Players released

Lost via retirement

Player signings

Draft picks

Below are the Boston Bruins' selections at the 2017 NHL Entry Draft, which was held on June 23 and 24, 2017 at the United Center in Chicago.

Notes:
 The Edmonton Oilers' second-round pick went to the Boston Bruins as compensation for Edmonton hiring Peter Chiarelli as their president and general manager on April 25, 2015.
 The Florida Panthers' seventh-round pick went to the Boston Bruins as the result of a trade on June 25, 2016 that sent a seventh-round pick in 2016 to Florida in exchange for this pick.

References

Boston Bruins seasons
Boston Bruins
Boston Bruins
Boston Bruins
Boston Bruins
Bruins
Bruins